The 2020 Florida Atlantic Owls football team represented Florida Atlantic University in the 2020 NCAA Division I FBS football season. The Owls played their home games at FAU Stadium in Boca Raton, Florida, and competed in the East Division of Conference USA (CUSA). They were led by head coach Willie Taggart, in his first year.

Previous season
The Owls finished the 2019 regular season 11–3, 7–1 in CUSA play which they finished in first place in the East Division, the programs second second division title. Florida Atlantic played against UAB in the conference championship game. The Owls played in the game for the second time in three years and defeated the Blazers. The team was invited to play in the Boca Raton Bowl against SMU, where the Owls took their eleventh win of the season.

Preseason

Awards 
Listed in the order that they were released

CUSA media days
The CUSA Media Days was be held virtually for the first time in conference history.

Schedule
Florida Atlantic announced its 2020 football schedule on January 8, 2020. The 2020 schedule originally consisted of 6 home and 6 away games in the regular season.

The Owls had games scheduled against Minnesota, Old Dominion, Stony Brook, and Middle Tennessee which were canceled due to the COVID-19 pandemic.

The Owls also had games scheduled against Georgia Southern, South Florida, and Southern Miss, which were postponed due to the pandemic. The Georgia Southern game is now rescheduled for December 5 and the Southern Miss game is now rescheduled for December 10. They also added a new game against UMass on November 20 to replace their canceled game against Old Dominion, which was previously scheduled for that same weekend.

Schedule Source:

Game summaries

Charlotte

at Marshall

UTSA

Western Kentucky

at FIU

UMass

at Georgia Southern

at Southern Miss

vs. Memphis (Montgomery Bowl)

References

Florida Atlantic
Florida Atlantic Owls football seasons
Florida Atlantic Owls football